Mandyleigh Storm (born 27 May 1972) is an English female singer-songwriter.

Biography
Storm was born on 27 May 1972 in Southampton, England. After three years of ballroom dancing between the ages of 8 and 11, and at the same time a stint at modeling, she settled on singing in her mid teenage years.

She sang Barbra Streisand songs and developed a love for music from the 1930s through to the 1960s, in particular jazz standards, gospel, soul and the blues.

In addition to Streisand, she has cited her influences as John Lennon, Janis Joplin, Nick Drake, Jackie Wilson, Seal, Sarah Vaughn, Nina Simone, George Michael, Annie Lennox, The Beatles, Coldplay and Jamiroquai.

In November 2006, Storm signed up to the Dutch crowdsourcing website Sellaband. By June 2007 she became the seventh artist to raise US$50,000 (and the 1st artist from Australia) from the fans, and the album, called Fire & Snow, was released March 2008.

The album was recorded in Soho, London, in November 2007 and produced by Mick Glossop, who has also worked with Van Morrison, Frank Zappa, PIL, The Waterboys and Sinéad O'Connor.

Discography
 Fire & Snow (2008)

Compilations
 How We See The World (2007)
 Sellaband Presents Part 2 (2007)

References

 Tribune – Edition 14 – SellaBand from the Wayback Machine
 Tribune – Edition 18 – SellaBand from the Wayback Machine
 Tribune – Edition 42 – SellaBand from the Wayback Machine

1972 births
Living people
English women singer-songwriters
Musicians from Southampton
Musicians from Perth, Western Australia
21st-century English women singers
21st-century English singers